Bebe, Bèbè, Bebé, Bébé or BeBe may refer to:

People and fictional characters
 Bebe (given name), a list of people and fictional characters with the given name or nickname
 Bebé, footballer Tiago Manuel Dias Correia (born 1990)
 Bebé (futsal player), Portuguese futsal player Euclides Gomes Vaz (born 1983)
 Bebe (futsal player, born 1990) (born 1990), Spanish futsal player Rafael García Aguilera
 Bebe (singer), stage name of Spanish singer and actress María Nieves Rebolledo Vila (born 1978)
 Bebe Cool, African reggae and ragga musician Moses Ssali (born 1977)
 Bébé Manga, Cameroonian makossa singer Elizabeth Manga (1948–2011)
 Bebe Rexha, stage name of American singer-songwriter Bleta Rexha (born 1989)
 BeBe Zahara Benet, stage name of American drag performer and singer Nea Marshall Kudi Ngwa (born 1980)
 Bebe Zeva, pseudonym of Jewish-American fashion blogger, model, and writer Rebeccah Hershkovitz (born 1993)
 Carlos Bebé, Cape Verdean footballer Carlos Jorge Fernandes Batalha (born 1992)
 Tilly Bébé, stage name of Austrian circus performer Mathilde Rupp (1879–1932)

Songs
 "Bébé" (song), written by Senegalese singer Youssou N'Dour and composed by Ibrahima N'Dour
 "Bebe" (6ix9ine song), a 2018 song by rapper 6ix9ine
 "Bebe" (Inna and Vinka song), a 2019 song by Romanian singer Inna and Ugandan recording artist Vinka

Other uses
 Cyclone Bebe, a 1972 Pacific Ocean storm
 Bebe, Texas, United States, an unincorporated community
 Bebe language, a language of Cameroon
 Peugeot Bébé, a car made by Peugeot from 1905 to 1916
 BeBe TV, original name of Duck TV, a children's television channel
 Bebe Stores, American clothing retailer
 BeBe, cookies by Czech brand Opavia

See also
 Bebee (disambiguation)
 Beebe (disambiguation)
 Beebee (disambiguation)
 Bibi (disambiguation)
 BB (disambiguation)